Renato Vrbičić (21 November 1970 – 12 June 2018) was a Croatian professional water polo player and coach who was a member of the senior Croatia national team, that won the silver medal at the 1996 Summer Olympics held in Atlanta.

He died in a sleep at his home in Šibenik on 12 June 2018, due to a heart attack. He was buried in his hometown on 14 June 2018.

Playing career
As a player, Vrbičić spent most of his career with hometown club VK Šibenik. He was a part of the senior Croatia national team at the 1996 Summer Olympics held in Atlanta, where they have won the silver medal.

Coaching career
After he finished his playing career, Vrbičić worked as an assistant coach of the junior men's Croatia national team and as assistant coach to his former teammate Denis Šupe at VK Adriatic bench.

In 2015, Vrbičić was appointed as the head coach of the newly formed VK Solaris. In June 2018, following his death, Joško Kreković replaced him.

See also
 List of Olympic medalists in water polo (men)

References

External links
 

1970 births
2018 deaths
Croatian male water polo players
Croatian water polo coaches
Olympic silver medalists for Croatia in water polo
Water polo players at the 1996 Summer Olympics
Medalists at the 1996 Summer Olympics
Sportspeople from Šibenik
Croatian expatriate sportspeople in Italy
Expatriate water polo players